Lejogaster metallina is a Palearctic species of hoverfly.

Description
External images
For terms see Morphology of Diptera
Shiny metallic green. Antennae completely black. Antennomere 3 round. Legs black. The male genitalia are figured by Maibach, A. & Goeldlin de Tiefenau (1994) . The larva is illustrated by Hartley (1961)  

Wing length 4·75-6·5 mm.
See references for determination.

Distribution
Palearctic Fennoscandia and the Faroes South to Iberia and the Mediterranean basin. Ireland eastwards through Europe to the Russian Far East and Siberia to the Pacific.

Biology
Habitat: Wetland; mire, fen, marsh, pool and lake edge; along brooks in Quercus ilex forest in southern Europe.
Flowers visited include Ranunculaceae,  white umbellifers, Cochlearia, Convolvulus, Leontodon, Polygonum, Symphoricarpos and Valeriana. The flight period is May to June and August to September. The larva is aquatic, living among submerged plant roots.

References

Diptera of Europe
Eristalinae
Insects described in 1777
Taxa named by Johan Christian Fabricius